Bordes-Uchentein is a commune in the department of Ariège, southern France. The municipality was established on 1 January 2017 by merger of the former communes of Les Bordes-sur-Lez (the seat) and Uchentein.

See also 
Communes of the Ariège department

References 

Communes of Ariège (department)

Communes nouvelles of Ariège
Populated places established in 2017
2017 establishments in France